The Mercedes-Benz W124 is a range of mid-size cars made by Daimler-Benz from 1984 to 1997. The range included numerous body configurations, and though collectively referred to as the W-124, official internal chassis designations varied by body style: saloon (W 124);  estate (S 124); coupé (C 124); cabriolet (A 124); limousine (V 124); rolling chassis (F 124); and long-wheelbase rolling chassis (VF 124).

From 1993, the 124 series was officially marketed as the E-Class. The W 124 followed the 123 series from 1984 and was succeeded by the W 210 E-Class (saloons, estates, rolling chassis) after 1995, and the C 208 CLK-Class (coupés, and cabriolets) in 1997.

In North America, the W124 was launched in early November 1985 as a 1986 model and marketed through the 1995 model year. Series production began at the beginning of November 1984, with press presentation on Monday, 26 November 1984 in Seville, Spain, and customer deliveries and European market launch starting in January 1985.

History

The W124 was a mid-sized vehicle platform, which entered planning in the autumn of 1976 under development Hans Scherenberg. In July 1977, the W124 program officially began, with R&D commencing work under newly appointed Werner Breitschwerdt. In April 1978, decisions were made to base it on the Mercedes-Benz W201 model program. By April 1979, a package plan was completed for the program, laying out the guidelines of the project. During the winter of 1980–1981, the final exterior for the W124 program was completed, chosen as the leading proposal by design director Bruno Sacco, and approved by the board of management in early 1981. By mid-1982, the first prototypes reflective of the production design, were assembled and sent to testing. In March 1984, pilot production commenced and development of the sedan concluded with engineering sign-off.

Front suspension used a separate spring and damper with a rubber top mount. The rear suspension of the W124 featured the Mercedes multi-link axle introduced in 1982 with the Mercedes W201 and which is now standard on many modern cars. Estate cars (and optionally, saloons and coupés) had Citroën-like rear self-leveling suspension with suspension struts rather than shock absorbers, gas-filled suspension spheres to provide damping and an under bonnet pressurizing pump. Unlike the traditional Citroën application, the Mercedes suspension system had a fixed ride height and employed rear coil springs to maintain the static ride height when parked.

The W124 was the first Mercedes series to be fitted with the iconic 15-hole, flat-faced alloy wheels characteristic of Mercedes-Benz cars of the 1980s and 1990s. The alloy wheels were nicknamed 'gullideckel' or manhole covers, because they resemble manhole or drainage covers in Germany, which are consistently round in shape with a series of 15- or 16-holes around the outer edge, often within a concentric ring. Gullideckel wheels in a variety of diameter and offset specifications were later incorporated into the facelift versions of the W126 S-Class, R107 SL and W201 190E series, and were also the 'non-option' wheel on the R129 SL-Class roadster.

Much of the 124's engineering and many of its features were advanced automotive technology at its introduction, incorporating innovations that have been adopted throughout the industry. It had one of the lowest coefficient of drag (Cd) of any vehicle of the time (0.28 for the 200/200D model for the European market with 185/65 R15 tires) due to its aerodynamic body, that included plastic molding for the undercarriage to streamline airflow beneath the car, reducing fuel consumption and wind noise. It had a single windscreen wiper that had an eccentric mechanism at its base that extended the wiper's reach to the top corners of the windscreen (more than if it had traveled in a simple arc). The saloon/sedan, coupés and convertibles had optional rear headrests that would fold down remotely to improve rearward visibility when required. This feature was not available for the T-model because of its specific layout (no space to store the retractable headrests), but the estate serially came with a "neighbour-friendly" rear door that was pulled in the shut-position silently and automatically by a sensor-controlled servomotor. This allowed the use of a tighter fitting rear gate, minimizing the cabin noise in the T-model - sometimes an area of concern for station wagons.

The estate cars (chassis designation S124) came in 5 or 7-seat models, the 7-seater having a rear-facing bench seat that folded flush luggage compartment cover and an optional (in the US until 1994) retractable cargo net. To provide a flat loading floor with the seat folded down, the T-model's rear seat squab was mounted about  higher than in saloons, robbing rear seat passengers of some head room. The S124 estate continued in production alongside the new W210 until the S210 estate launched more than a year later. A two-door coupé version was also built, with the chassis designation C124.

The E 320, E 220, and E 200 cabriolets ceased production in 1997. Indian assembly (in a joint-venture with Telco called Mercedes-Benz India) began in March 1995. Offered with five-cylinder diesel engines built by Mercedes' Indian partner Bajaj Tempo, the W124 was replaced there in December 1997.

Models
The pre-facelift models from 1985 to 1993 used the model designations: 200/200 T (carburettor), 200 E/200 TE (originally intended for Italian market due to Italy's tax rates on cars larger than 2 liters; available in Germany since September 1988), 200 CE, 230 E/230 TE, 230 CE, 260 E (saloon only), 300 E/TE, 300 CE, 300 E-24/300 CE-24/300 TE-24 valve, 400 E (not in the UK), & 500 E (LHD only in the UK). Diesel models consisted of the following designations; the 200 D/200 TD (not in the UK), 250 D/250 TD and the 300 D/300 TD. Facelift models produced from 1993 to 1996 used the following model designations: E 200, E 220, E 280, E 320, E 420 (not in the UK) & E 500 (LHD only in the UK). Both saloon and estate versions of the facelifted model carried the same model designation on their boot lid, i.e. the T was no longer used for estate versions. In the UK post-facelift diesels were E 250 Diesel (saloon only) and E 300 Diesel (saloon & estate) models. The W124 was also offered as a long wheelbase saloon targeted for taxi companies, but the more luxury equipped version was also used as a limousine.

The table gives preproduction to end of production as per Daimler. Daimler lists November 1984 as the start of production for the series but also lists 1985 as part of preproduction for any specific early model. No regular deliveries occurred in 1984.

Dimensions and weight

Gallery (Pre-facelift)

Gallery (Post-facelift)

500 E

Mercedes-Benz sold a high performance version of the W124, the 500 E, created in close cooperation with and assembled by Porsche. It used the 5.0 L 32-valve V8 M119 Engine based on the engine from the 500 SL (R129) roadster. Porsche engineered the suspension and chassis design with a performance bias. Mercedes entered an agreement with Porsche to assemble the vehicles at their plant in Zuffenhausen, as the automaker was in crisis, and its factory capacitiy was underutilized.
Porsche also constructed the chassis for the 400 E, which was in essence identical to the 500 E's chassis.

Masterpiece

In some countries, the final batch of W124 was sold as the limited edition Masterpiece in 1995. Following the impending release of its successor, the Mercedes-Benz W210, the remaining units of W124 were fitted with additional accessories found in stock models such as walnut wood steering wheel (optional), airbag for front passenger, walnut center console glove box, electric rear blind and rear seat side window sunshade (optional). There were also 4 unique pieces of accessories fitted to Masterpieces which were not available to any other W124 around the world – gear knob engraved with the word Masterpiece, stainless door sills engraved with Mercedes Benz, Masterpiece label on the right side of the boot and the brand new 6-hole light alloy wheels.

Engines

Build quality

The W124 gained a good reputation for reliability. In 1995 the diesel engined version topped the "upper middle class" category in a reliability survey of 4–6-year-old cars undertaken by the German Automobile Association (ADAC), with 11.8 recorded breakdowns per 1,000 vehicles for four-year-old cars and 21.6 for six-year-old ones: this compared with 14.6 breakdowns per 1,000 cars for four-year-old Audi 100s and 27.3 for six-year-old big Audis.

References

Notes

Bibliography

General

Workshop manuals

External links

 Curbside Classic: Mercedes W124 (1985–1996 E-Class) The Best Car Of The Past Thirty Years – retrospective of the W124
 http://www.w124.org French speaking club for all Mercedes W124 (1984–1996)

W124
W124
Cars introduced in 1984
1990s cars
Rear-wheel-drive vehicles
All-wheel-drive vehicles
Sedans
Station wagons
Coupés
Convertibles
Limousines
Cars discontinued in 1997